The Haraz River is a notable river flowing through the Mazandaran Province of northern Iran. It flows northwards, from the Alborz mountain range into the Caspian Sea. Haraz river after flowing along the Haraz Road and Valley for about 100 km it meanders in the midst of Amol, from where it reaches the Caspian Sea. Haraz River begins from Mount Damavand and flows northward and pours into Caspian Sea in the area between the two northern cities of Mahmoudabad and Fereydunkenar. The Haraz River is currently contaminated due to discharges of effluent from various industrial plants.

Geography

Course
The Haraz River originates at the foot of  Mount Damavand in Larijan District, the highest peak of the Alborz Range. From its mountain source, it flows down into the Haraz River Valley, into the city of Amol, and onto its River mouth in the southern Caspian Sea between the towns of Fereydoon Kenar in Fereydunkenar County and  Mahmoudabad in Mahmudabad County.

Haraz River Valley
Road 77 (Haraz Road) follows the river over the Hashem Pass and through the valley, and is the most important road from Tehran to the Caspian coast.

Central Alborz mountain range map

See also

References

External links
 

Rivers of Mazandaran Province
Tributaries of the Caspian Sea
Alborz (mountain range)
Amol
Amol County
Mahmudabad County
Tourist attractions in Amol